Glendale station may refer to:
 Glendale Transportation Center, a station in Glendale, California
 Glendale station (LIRR), a former station in Glendale, Queens, New York
 Parkside station or Glendale station, a station in Forest Hills, Queens, New York